Chi Va Chi Sau Ka is a 2017 Indian Marathi-language romantic comedy-drama film produced by Zee Studios and directed by Paresh Mokashi. It stars Lalit Prabhakar and Mrinmayee Godbole. It includes Pushkar Lonarkar, Jyoti Subhash, Supriya Pathare, Pradeep Joshi, Sunil Abhyankar and Purnima Talwalkar in supporting roles. The film had its theatrical release on 19 May 2017 in India.

The film trailer was released on 30 April 2017. The film was remade in Gujarati as Sharato Lagu.

Story
The main characters are Savitri and Satyaprakash. Savitri is a vegan who works as a veterinarian at an animal shelter and Satyaprakash is an engineer who manufactures products related to solar energy. They are introduced to each other as prospective marriage partners by their parents, having met earlier at the wedding of common friends. The film charts their journey from their first formal meeting to their eventual marriage. This film differs from a traditional plot as it is frequently interrupted by a narrating character that breaks the fourth wall and outlines the recently passed events.

Synopsis 
The film is a satire on the institute of marriage in the current changing world of values. Savi is a vegan who works as a veterinarian at an animal shelter and Satya is an engineer who manufactures products related to solar energy. Both are satisfied in their fields and have won the youth icon award for their work. They are introduced to each other as prospective marriage partners by their parents, having met earlier at the wedding of common friends. During the meeting, Saavi puts forth a condition that she wants to stay with Satya at his house for 2 months in order to test their compatibility and future. Initially everyone except Satya is against this, he thinks it will be a good experiment. When they both explain how arranged marriage couples usually don't get along well and may end up in divorce, eventually everyone agrees. Saavi has 2 conditions: First, that their relationship will be completely platonic and second that Satya will have to give up non-veg food. Satya agrees and hence Saavi shifts to his house. Over the next 2 months, Satya and Saavi get to know each other, their professions and their interests. Saavi helps Satya in acquiring important work related papers while Satya helps to raise funds for Saavi's animal shelter and the two soon start falling in love. However, in the success party of Satya's project where he plans to propose to Saavi, She notices non-veg food being cooked inside and gets very angry on Satya. Satya also gets upset that she doesn't want to adjust at all, and tells her that he changed his daily habits only because of Saavi's request and he cannot force the others to give up non-vegetarian food and accept a vegan lifestyle. Both get into a heated argument and become disheartened. Satya and Saavi meet again at the youth icon award ceremony and confess their feelings comically at a press interview where Satya gifts Saavi a pet puppy named Galleo. The film ends with Satya and Saavi getting married.

Cast

 Lalit Prabhakar as Satyaprakash/ Satya
 Mrinmayee Godbole as Savitri/Savi
 Bharat Ganeshpure as Marriage Registrar
 Pushkar Lonarkar as Savi's brother
 Sharmishtha Raut as Savi's sister, Ragini
 Jyoti Subhash as Satya's Aaji
 Supriya Pathare as Satya's mother
 Pradeep Joshi as Satya's father
 Sunil Abhyankar as Savi's father
 Purnima Talwalkar as Savi's mother
 Arti More as Neha
 Ruturaj Shinde as Raj

Release
Chi Va Chi Sau Ka released on 19 May 2017 with English subtitles in Maharashtra, Gujarat, Goa, Madhya Pradesh, Delhi, Karnataka, Andhra Pradesh and Telangana.

Soundtrack

The songs for the film are composed by Narendra Bhide and lyrics by Paresh Mokashi.

Reception
The film was released on 19 May 2017 all over Maharashtra and received good reception. The film received a huge response at the box office. It completed 100 days run in many centres of Maharashtra.

Critical reception

Ganesh Matkari of Pune Mirror gave the film a rating of 2 out of 5 and said that, "this is not Paresh Mokashi’s best work till date." The critic concluded his review saying that, "the film is not without its moments. It is reasonably amusing for most part." Shalaka Nalawade of The Times of India gave the film a rating of 4 out of 5 and said that the film is not without any weak points but the reasons to watch it outnumber the loopholes in the story. Keyur Seta of Cinestaan gave the film a rating of 2 out of 5 saying that, "Paresh Mokashi's film, though loud in parts, does have its moments. Overall, Chi Va Chi Sau Ka is a decent family entertainer." Ulhas Shirke of Marathi Movie World gave the film a rating of 2 out of 5 saying that, "Performances from the artistes are just fine, but all of them are too loud and quarreling with each other most of the time, which has taken away the interest from the subject of ‘Chi Va Chi Sau Ka‘ film." Aditya Savnal of Marathi Stars gave the film a rating of 3 out of 5 saying that, "Despite its shortcomings, Chi Ka Va Sau Ka has several enjoyable and laugh out loud moments."

Remake
The film was remade in 2018 Gujarati film Sharato Lagu.

References

External links 
 

2017 films
2017 comedy-drama films
Indian comedy-drama films
2010s Marathi-language films
Marathi films remade in other languages
Films directed by Paresh Mokashi